USS Tech may refer to more than one United States Navy ship:

 , a patrol boat in commission during the autumn of 1917
 , a patrol boat in commission from August to October 1917

United States Navy ship names